Aled James (born 17 February 1982) is a Welsh rugby league player-coach for the South Wales Scorpions in the Championship 1.

Background
James was born in Caerphilly, Wales.

International honours
Aled James won caps for Wales while at Widnes, Sheffield, and Celtic Crusaders 2003...present 6(9?)-caps + 2-caps (interchange/substitute) 1(2?)-try 4(8?)-points.

He was named in the Wales squad to face England at the Keepmoat Stadium prior to England's departure for the 2008 Rugby League World Cup.

References

External links
Crusaders website
Mills leads Wales against England
Celtic Crusaders sign Wales duo
Welsh pair chase début dream
{https://web.archive.org/web/20101109123707/http://www.scorpionsrl.com/team_member.php?id=513 Scorpions profile]

1982 births
Living people
Cardiff Demons players
Crusaders Rugby League players
Footballers who switched code
People educated at Ysgol Gyfun Cwm Rhymni
Rugby league centres
Rugby league five-eighths
Rugby league players from Caerphilly
Rugby league wingers
Sheffield Eagles players
South Wales Scorpions players
Wales national rugby league team players
Welsh rugby league coaches
Welsh rugby league players
Welsh rugby union players
Widnes Vikings players